KRQZ (91.5 FM, "RadioU") is a non-commercial radio station that is licensed to Lompoc, California and serves the Santa Maria—Lompoc area. The station is owned by Spirit Communications, Inc. and broadcasts a youth-targeted Christian rock format, relaying the signal of WUFM in Columbus, Ohio via satellite.

History
KRQZ was first signed on September 3, 2000, by Trinity Church of the Nazarene in Lompoc, California. The station began airing the Christian rock format of the nationally syndicated RadioU network, originating from WUFM in Columbus, Ohio.

In 2014, Trinity Church of the Nazarene transferred the station's license to Spirit Communications, Inc., the nonprofit organization that owns WUFM.

Translators
KRQZ is rebroadcast on two FM translator stations serving the Central Coast of California:

References

External links

Santa Barbara County, California
Radio stations established in 2000
RQZ